Millet plus rifles, also known as "Millet and rifles" or "a rifle with bags of millet", was a phrase used by Mao Zedong to describe the materials and supplies of the People's Liberation Army (PLA). The first recorded instance of Mao using this phrase is in a speech he gave at a party meeting in Yan'an. He was recalling a conversation with David D. Barrett, an American military officer sent to observe the Communist forces fighting in WWII. When warned that the Americans would support Chiang Kai-Shek against the Communists if they refused to enter into a coalition government, Mao had responded:

The phrase became well-known in the west after Mao repeated it in an interview with American war correspondent Anna Louise Strong on August 6, 1946. He said:

It reflects Mao's view that the inferior equipment of the PLA was enough to defeated the well-equipped and well-supplied Kuomintang (KMT) soldiers in the Chinese Communist Revolution, since the people of China were behind the communist cause. Millet (along with wheat), was the main food source of the Eighth Route Army during the Second Sino-Japanese War, and was considered by the soldiers to have been a mediocre foodstuff. Rifles, of course, were the main armament of the Chinese armies of that period, with the Communists mainly using those they acquired from the Soviet Union. The phrase was quickly adopted by the Chinese Communist Party as propaganda to heroize their underdog struggle against the KMT.

Evaluations
Some scholars attribute the PLA's military from the Chinese Civil War (国共内战) until the Korean War as a result of the "millet plus rifles" strategy. Other researchers argue that "millet plus rifles" is merely a metaphor for the PLA's victory over the superiorly equipped Kuomintang army, and does not literally correspond to the realities of large-scale campaign, defensive, and urban offensive battles of the Civil War. Some researchers also point out that the phrase "millet plus rifles" minimizes the importance of Soviet military aid during the Civil War. Although the importance of Soviet assistance was acknowledged by Chen Yun, Hu Qiaomu, and other CCP officials, academic circles in the Mainland China have minimized its impact. Most historians widely agree that the PLA entered the war at a significant material disadvantage vis-à-vis the KMT's forces. A few argue that the idea of "millet plus rifles" is a "self-made myth" by the CCP used to gain legitimacy.

References

Maoist China
Maoist terminology